Stuart Denzil Rhodes (born 24 March 1910 – 7 January 1989) was an English cricketer, whose first-class career lasted from 1930 to 1935 with Nottinghamshire County Cricket Club (including serving as captain in his final year).

References

External links

English cricketers
Nottinghamshire cricketers
Nottinghamshire cricket captains
People from Sneinton
Cricketers from Nottinghamshire
1910 births
1989 deaths
English cricketers of 1919 to 1945
Sir Julien Cahn's XI cricketers
Hertfordshire cricketers